Mokhor or Mokhur or Makhur or Makhowr or Mokhowr, also rendered as Mukhvor, may refer to:
 Mokhor, Hamadan
 Mokhor, Kurdistan
 Mokhor, Chaldoran, West Azerbaijan Province
 Mokhor, Showt, West Azerbaijan Province